Maata Te Taiawatea Rangitukehu ( 1848/1849 – 27 June 1929) was a notable New Zealand tribal leader. Of Māori descent, she identified with the Ngāti Awa, Te Arawa and Tuhourangi iwi. She was born in Lake Tarawera, Rotorua, New Zealand in about 1848.

References

1840s births
1929 deaths
People from Rotorua
Te Arawa people
Ngāti Awa people
Tuhourangi people